Greg Long (born December 12, 1966) is an American contemporary Christian music solo artist and also a member of the contemporary Christian pop group Avalon.

Background 

Long was born in Aberdeen, South Dakota. He began singing at the age of two, in his father's revivals. He is married to fellow Avalon band member Janna Long.

As a solo artist, Long has had four songs reach No. 1 on the Contemporary Christian charts: "How Long?" (a duet with Margaret Becker) from his first solo album, then "What a Friend" and "Think About Jesus" in 1995 and "Love the Lord" in 1996. Long was a 1998 GMA Dove Award nominee.

In 2003, Long joined Avalon, replacing founding member Michael Passons.

Discography 

 Cross My Heart (Myrrh Records/Pakaderm Records 1994)
 Days of Grace (Myrrh Records 1996)
 Jesus Saves (Word Records 1998)
 Now (Myrrh Records 2000)
 Born Again (Christian Records 2004)
 The Definitive Collection (Word Records 2008 compilation album)

References

External links
 

1966 births
Living people
American performers of Christian music
People from Aberdeen, South Dakota
People from Sisseton, South Dakota